Bruce Michael Byron is an English actor best known for his role as DC Terry Perkins in The Bill. He originally followed a career in music, before started acting at 20.

Biography
He moved to Australia drilling for oil and gas in the Cooper Basin, then came back to England but could not get a place at drama school. Eventually, he was accepted for ARTTS International in Bubwith, East Riding of Yorkshire.

Films he has appeared in include The Messenger: The Story of Joan of Arc, From Hell and, most notably, The Mummy Returns where he played Red Willits. He also appeared in Heartbeat in 1998 and as Robbie Jackson's father Gary Bolton in EastEnders in 2001.

He married Dr Tanya Byron (presenter of BBC's Little Angels and The House of Tiny Tearaways and daughter of director John Sichel) in Barnet, London, in 1997. He has two children with her: Lily (born 1995, Hendon, London) and Jack (born 1998, Barnet).

Byron made a series of guest appearances in The Bill, the last of which in 2003 as DC Terry Perkins from neighbouring station Barton Street, led to him joining the series full-time as the same character; he played Terry for seven years until the show ended in 2010.

He also played Phil Dans in Casualty on 10 March and 17 March 2012, series 26; episode 26 and episode 31.

Filmography

References

External links

English male film actors
English male television actors
Living people
Place of birth missing (living people)
1959 births
People from Fulham